Daxu is a town in Tongshan District, Xuzhou, Jiangsu Province, China. , it administers the following 23 villages:
Daxu Village
Zhumiao Village
Dongtan Village
Xitan Village
Zhuzhuang Village
Shaolou Village
Yuehai Village
Liulu Village
Magou Village
Tuanbu Village
Houwang Village
Taishan Village
Jiushan Village
Hexi Village
Banqiao Village
Hengshan Village
Liyuan Village
Jiancheng Village
Zhengmiao Village
Shazhuang Village
Fangting Village
Dawu Village
Xiaodun Village

References

Administrative divisions of Xuzhou
Township-level divisions of Jiangsu